Lundgrenfjellet is a mountain in Nathorst Land at Spitsbergen, Svalbard. It has a height of 1,054 m.a.s.l., and is named after Swedish geologist Sven Anders Bernhard Lundgren. The mountain is located south of Van Mijenfjorden, north of the glaciers of Vengebreen and Rånebreen, west of the valley of Danzigdalen.

References

Mountains of Spitsbergen